Pycnodontidae is an extinct family of ray-finned fishes, ranging from the Triassic period until the Eocene.

Genera
 Acrotemnus Agassiz, 1843
 Anomoeodus Forir, 1887
 Athrodon Sauvage, 1880
 Callodus Thurmond, 1974
 Coccodus
 Coelodus Haeckel 
 Gyrodus Agassiz, 1843
 Iemanja Wenz, 1989
 Macromesodon Blake, 1905
 Microdus
 Micropycnodon Hibbard and Graffham, 1945
 Neoproscinetes De Figueiredo and Silva Santos, 1990
 Nonaphalagodus Thurmond, 1974
 Omphalodus von Meyer, 1847
 Paleobalistum
 Paramicrodon Thurmond, 1974
 Polypsephis Hay, 1899
 Proscinetes Gistl, 1848
 Pycnodus Agassiz, 1835
 Pycnomicrodon Hibbard and Graffham, 1941
 Scalacurvichthys Cawley and Kriwet, 2017
 Sphaerodus Agassiz, 1843
 Stemmatodus
 Tepexichthys Applegate, 1992
 Thiollierepycnodus Ebert, 2020
 Typodus Quenstedt, 1858

References

Pycnodontiformes
Triassic first appearances
Lutetian extinctions
Prehistoric ray-finned fish families